A breastplate or chestplate is a device worn over the torso to protect it from injury, as an item of religious significance, or as an item of status. A breastplate is sometimes worn by mythological beings as a distinctive item of clothing. It is also a term for a piece of clothing used by drag queens and cross-dressing performers, which mimics a woman's cleavage or breasts.

European
In medieval weaponry, the breastplate is the front portion of plate armour covering the torso. It has been a military mainstay since ancient times and was usually made of leather, bronze or iron in antiquity. By around 1000 AD, solid plates had fallen out of use in Europe and knights of the period were wearing mail in the form of a hauberk over a padded tunic. Plates protecting the torso reappeared in the 1220s as plates directly attached to a knightly garment known as the surcoat. Around 1250 this developed into the coat of plates which continued to be in use for about a century. True breastplates reappear in Europe in 1340 first composed of wrought iron and later of steel. These early breastplates were made of several plates and only covered the upper torso with the lower torso not being protected by plate until the development of the fauld around 1370. They were between 1 mm and 2.5 mm thick. In order to prevent the wearer from being cut by their own armour, the design featured outward turned edges that also increased stiffness. In some cases, further strength was added by a ridge running down through the centre of the plate. The first evidence for one-piece breastplates is from an altarpiece in the Pistoia cathedral dated to 1365. Complete, lightweight, one or two-piece breastplates were readily used by the first decade of the 15th century. The French term pancier, which became English  and German panzer, was also used.
 
Bullet-proof vests are the modern descendant of the breastplate.

Classical mythology
Both Zeus and Athena are sometimes depicted as wearing a goatskin shield or breastplate called an Aegis. At the center of Athena’s shield was the head of Medusa.

Asian

A "breastplate" or "breastpiece" was among the clothes of the Jewish High Priest. In the Bible, the word 'breastplate' is used figuratively to describe protecting oneself from unrighteousness (cf.

The 14th century Majapahit Empire manufactured breastplate, called karambalangan. The most notable people using this type of breastplate is Gajah Mada, which is reported by Sundanese patih as wearing golden embossed karambalangan, armed with gold-layered spear, and with a shield full of diamond decoration. In Kidung Sunda canto 2 stanza 85 it is explained that the mantris (ministers or officers) of Gajah Mada wore armor in the form of chain mail or breastplate with gold decoration and dressed in yellow attire.

North American

The hair-pipe breastplates of 19th-century Interior Plains people were made from the West Indian conch, brought to New York docks as ballast and then traded to Native Americans of the upper Missouri River. Their popularity spread rapidly after their invention by the Comanche in 1854. They were too fragile and expensive to be considered armour, and were instead a symbol of wealth during the economic depression among Plains Indians after the buffalo were almost exterminated.

Judaism 
According to the biblical Book of Exodus, a square breastplate embedded with 12 different gemstones, each inscribed with the name of a tribe of Israel, was worn by the High Priest. One notable use of the breastplate was to discern God's will through the glint of the gemstones. Exodus 28:30

Drag breast plate

This is a silicone or similar type of plastic vest or torso-plate that is placed over the male performers chest, to mimic a woman's breast or cleavage. They are usually in a colour that matches the performer's own skin or to match an associated costume.

See also
 Armour
 Cuirass
 Muscle cuirass
 Lance rest
 Linothorax
 Pteruges

Citations

References

External links
 

Body armor
Western plate armour